Roger Joseph McHugh (24 July 1908 – 2 January 1987) was an Irish academic, author, playwright, politician and Irish Republican.

He was educated Our Lady's Bower, Athlone; Synge Street CBS, Dublin and University College Dublin (UCD). 

McHugh was a supporter of a minor Irish Republican political party Córas na Poblachta and a friend of Irish Republican Army leader Seamus O'Donovan. In 1939 McHugh was interned by the Irish Free State at the Curragh Internment Camp. 

He was elected to Seanad Éireann as an independent member in 1954 by the National University constituency. He lost his seat at the 1957 election.

In 1965 he became Professor of English at UCD and in 1966 he was appointed the first Professor of Anglo–Irish Literature and Drama.

References

External links
Roger McHugh – Ricorso

1908 births
1987 deaths
Independent members of Seanad Éireann
Members of the 8th Seanad
Academics of University College Dublin
Alumni of University College Dublin
Members of Seanad Éireann for the National University of Ireland